Cururu toad is a common name used for several closely related large toads:

 Rhinella diptycha (synonym Rhinella schneideri) — from northern Argentina, Paraguay, Uruguay, eastern Bolivia, and eastern and southern Brazil
 Rhinella jimi — from northeastern Brazil
 Rhinella marina (cane toad) — widespread in Latin America and introduced elsewhere

See also
 Yellow cururu toad (Rhinella icterica)

Animal common name disambiguation pages